Saidabad (also Romanized as Sa‘īdābād) is a village in Dashtabi-ye Gharbi Rural District, Dashtabi District, Buin Zahra County, Qazvin Province, Iran. At the 2006 census, its population was 1,318, in 327 families.

References 

Populated places in Buin Zahra County